Brahea edulis, the Guadalupe palm or , is a palm endemic to Guadalupe Island, Mexico, although a few stands have been planted elsewhere.

Distribution and habitat
Brahea edulis is endemic to Guadalupe Island, Mexico, found in a monospecific grove around 20 hectares in area between  ASL on the north end of the island The scarped terrain, along with the maritime climate of the island, produces one of the few true fog oases in North America. The mainland Baja California Desert is influenced by fog, but the effect is greatly diluted by the lack of steep topography.

The entire native population consists of old trees with little successful recruitment for 150 years or so. Until recently, Guadalupe Island supported a large goat population (estimated at 100,000 in 1870, and 5,000 in 2000). The presence of these goats prevented regrowth of the native trees, including B. edulis, and as a consequence, the ecosystem was drastically altered: the once verdant island turned into an almost barren rock, with weeds replacing the former forests. Below  ASL, the palm is essentially the only remaining tree, occurring in a major subpopulation and scattered groups in sheltered locations. Above that, there used to be a band of mixed woodland where the palm was accompanied by Island Oak and Guadalupe Pine. This habitat has now all but disappeared due to the other trees becoming pushed back into higher regions.

Conservation 
The species was probably declining slowly since the mid-19th century. Its range might even have expanded a bit until the mid-20th century however; part of it was shared with other trees as noted above; especially the pine, which is a towering species that presumably grew in many sites now occupied by the palm. In addition, a forest of Guadalupe Cypress and California Juniper shrubland existed in the palm's present range; the cypress forest was eventually destroyed by the goats and the juniper is nowadays completely absent from the island.

Although endangered in the wild, B. edulis is cultivated, especially in California. In 2001, it was started to fence in patches of habitat on Guadalupe, and the long-envisioned removal of goats was effectively complete by 2005. Some hundreds of Guadalupe Palms remain on their island home today. As regrowth presumably was hindered by the goats eating the saplings rather than the trees having all become old and sterile, it is likely that the palm will eventually recover. That it was best able of all Guadalupe tree species to withstand the hordes of goats is evidenced by its present distribution; the other trees – if they survive at all – are limited to higher and less accessible areas. Nonetheless, the species is precariously rare and the IUCN considers it Endangered (EN C1).

References

External links
  (2003): On the urgency of conservation on Guadalupe Island, Mexico: is it a lost paradise? Biodiversity and Conservation 12(5): 1073–1082.  (HTML abstract)

edulis
Endangered plants
Trees of Mexican Pacific Islands
Trees of Baja California
Plants described in 1876